Diancta is a genus of sea snails in the family Diplommatinidae.

Species
Species within the genus Diancta include:
 Diancta aurea Neubert & Bouchet, 2015
 Diancta aurita Neubert & Bouchet, 2015
 Diancta basiplana Neubert & Bouchet, 2015
 Diancta constricta (Martens, 1864)
 Diancta controversa Neubert & Bouchet, 2015
 Diancta crookshanksi Poppe, Tagaro & Sarino, 2015
 Diancta densecostulata Neubert & Bouchet, 2015
 Diancta dextra Neubert & Bouchet, 2015
 Diancta dilatata Neubert & Bouchet, 2015
 Diancta distorta Neubert & Bouchet, 2015
 Diancta graeffei Möllendorff, 1897
 Diancta halmaherica Greķe, 2017
 Diancta macrostoma (Mousson, 1870)
 Diancta martensi (H. Adams, 1866)
 Diancta multiplicata von Möllendorff, 1902
 Diancta obiensis Greķe, 2017
 Diancta pulchella Neubert & Bouchet, 2015
 Diancta quadrata (Mousson, 1870)
 Diancta rotunda Neubert & Bouchet, 2015
 Diancta subquadrata Neubert & Bouchet, 2015
 Diancta taviensis (Liardet, 1876)
 Diancta torta O. Boettger, 1891
 Diancta trilamellata Neubert & Bouchet, 2015

Species brought into synonymy
 Diancta diepenheimi Preston, 1913: synonym of Palaina diepenheimi (Preston, 1913) (original combination)
 Diancta philippinica Quadras & Möllendorff, 1895: synonym of Paradiancta philippinica (Quadras & Möllendorff, 1895) (original combination)

References

The Diplommatinidae of Fiji – a hotspot of Pacific land snail biodiversity (Caenogastropoda, Cyclophoroidea). ZooKeys 487: 1-85

Diplommatinidae